Manfred Gnjidic is a lawyer in Germany.
In 2004 he was employed by Khalid El-Masri, a German citizen who  was subjected to extraordinary rendition by the CIA in the years past.
Gnjidic helped El-Masri launch a lawsuit against George Tenet and other Americans he alleges were involved in his rendition.

On December 8, 2005, following a meeting with United States Secretary of State Condoleezza Rice, German Chancellor Angela Merkel announced that Dr Rice had privately acknowledged that El-Masri had been captured and transported in error. Rice then offered her account, that she had merely acknowledged that the United States had made some errors, without acknowledging that El-Masri's rendition was an instance of those errors.

Gnjidic has announced his intention to subpoena Merkel to testify in El-Masri's lawsuit.

He also represents Aleem Nasir, a German citizen interrogated by Pakistani, American and British intelligence agents during a two-month-long extrajudicial detention in Pakistan. Gnjidic is investigating whether information gained under coercion during these interrogations may have been used to initiate a German investigation of Nasir.

References
  Europeans Investigate CIA Role in Abductions: Suspects Possibly Taken To Nations That Torture, Washington Post March 12, 2005
  Rice Brings Little Clarity to Europe, Der Spiegel, December 8, 2005
  In Terror Detention, Glimpses of Shadowy World in Pakistan, New York Times, September 24, 2007

External links
Glimpses of a Shadowy World in Pakistan NY Times September 24, 2007

21st-century German lawyers
Living people
Year of birth missing (living people)
20th-century births